The 2000 FIA GT Championship was the fourth FIA GT Championship, an auto racing series endorsed by the Fédération Internationale de l'Automobile (FIA) and organized by the Stéphane Ratel Organisation (SRO). The races featured grand touring cars divided into two categories, GT and N GT, with drivers and teams titles awarded for each category. The championship began on 26 March 2000 and ended 22 October 2000 after ten races, all held in Europe.

After the 1999 season featured just a single category of cars competing, the FIA GT Championship once again became a two-class series for 2000 with the introduction of the Group N-GT cars by the FIA.  The new category was positioned below the former GT2 class of cars from 1997 to 1999, now renamed to just GT, and was awarded an FIA Cup instead of a full FIA Championship. Britons Julian Bailey and Jamie Campbell-Walter won the GT Drivers' Championship with five victories, driving for the GT team champions Lister Storm Racing in their first full season of FIA GT competition. Christophe Bouchut and Patrice Goueslard were the inaugural N-GT Cup winners, driving for Teams title winners Larbre Compétition Chereau.

Schedule
The FIA GT Championship became a European-only series for 2000, dropping all fly-away races in North America and Asia.  The two German rounds at Hockenheimring and Oschersleben were replaced by a single race at EuroSpeedway Lausitz, while the A1-Ring returned to the series after a one-year absence. Valencia, Estoril, Brno, and Magny-Cours were all new events for the series. Donington Park was the only other European event not kept for 2000.

Entries

GT

N-GT

Results and standings

Race results

Points were awarded to the top six finishers in each category. Cars were required to complete at least 70% of the laps covered by the winning car in order to be classified as a finisher. Drivers were required to complete 20% of the distance covered by their car to earn points. Teams titles were awarded based on all the results obtained by a maximum of two cars per team.

Due to the Estoril round being abandoned before 75% of the race distance was completed, half points were awarded to the top six teams and drivers.

Driver championships

GT Championship

N-GT Cup

Team championships

GT Championship

N-GT Cup

References

External links
FIA GT Championship 2000 Sporting Regulations
 2000 FIA Championship Classifications

FIA GT Championship
FIA GT Championship seasons